El Loa Province is one of three provinces of the northern Chilean region of Antofagasta (II). It is named after the longest of rivers in Chile, the Loa River. The provincial capital is Calama.

Geography and demography
It is the sixth largest province in the country. Between the 1992 and 2002 censuses, the population grew by 14.9% (18,610 persons).

Communes
 Calama (capital)
 Ollagüe
 San Pedro de Atacama

References

External links
 Delegation of El Loa 

Provinces of Antofagasta Region
Provinces of Chile